The 2006–07 Israeli Hockey League season was the 16th season of Israel's hockey league. Five teams participated in the league, and the Haifa Hawks won the championship.

Regular season

Playoffs

Semifinals 
 Rishon-le-Zion - Haifa Hawks 1:4
 HC Ma'alot - HC Metulla 0:5

Final 
 Haifa Hawks - HC Metulla 4:3 SO

External links 
 Season on hockeyarchives.info

Israeli League
Israeli League (ice hockey) seasons
Seasons